In Māori tradition, Aotea is one of the canoes in which Māori migrated to New Zealand; it is particularly associated with the tribes of Taranaki and Whanganui, including Ngāti Ruanui, Ngāruahine, Ngā Rauru and other tribal groups.

History
Aotea was a double canoe built by Toto from half of a great tree from Hawaiki, the other half being used for the canoe Matahourua.  Toto gave Aotea to his daughter Rongorongo, who was married to Turi. In strife with the chief Uenuku, Turi killed the chief's son and thereafter had to flee for New Zealand with 33 passengers.  During the voyage, they stopped at Rangitahua and encountered some of the crew from the Kurahaupō canoe (Craig 1989:24).  The Aotea canoe arrived at Aotea Harbour on the west coast of the North Island, and its people eventually settled in the Taranaki region.

Aircraft
'Aotea' was the name given to the first Jumbo Jet (a Boeing 747-219B. Registration: ZK-NZV) acquired by Air New Zealand. This aircraft and several more of her type were acquired by Air New Zealand as a replacement aircraft for the carriers' DC-10 fleet.

See also
List of Māori waka

References
 
R.D. Craig, Dictionary of Polynesian Mythology (Greenwood Press: New York, 1989).

Māori waka
Māori mythology